The BQM-90 was an unmanned aircraft proposed for use as a target drone by the United States Armed Forces. Developed during the 1970s, no aircraft were built before the project was cancelled.

Overview
The BQM-90 project was begun in 1970 under the designation ZBQM-90A; the intent of the program was to create a supersonic, high-altitude target drone for use in testing air-to-air and surface-to-air missiles. It was to be launched from the ground or the air, using a turbojet powerplant, and would be controlled by either ground-baser or airborne control stations. At the end of a flight the drone was to deploy a parachute, allowing it to be recovered and re-used.

ZBQM-90A program was cancelled in 1973 due to a lack of funding.

See also
List of missiles

Target drones of the United States
Cancelled military aircraft projects of the United States
Unmanned aerial vehicles of the United States